Mole Men Against the Son of Hercules (/ Maciste, the Strongest Man in the World) is a 1961 Italian peplum film directed by Antonio Leonviola and starring Mark Forest.

Plot summary 
The young Princess Saliura has been captured by a fierce cave-dwelling people. Maciste and his friend Bangor, in whose care she was left, allow themselves to be also captured and imprisoned. They find themselves in a series of deep caverns, occupied by a race of mutant white-haired albino people. They are living under an ancient curse, by which they cannot emerge onto the surface, except by moonlight, and sunlight is deadly to them. They worship the goddess of the moon.

The 'mole men', led by Halis Mosab, a tyrannical and bloodthirsty non-albino queen, are using the captured people as slaves to operate their diamond mining operations. Saliura is assisted in an escape and is taken to sanctuary with the Guardians of the Sacred Waterfall. But she is betrayed and recaptured. Maciste and Bangor are forced to fight each other and then a ferocious ape in order to save the life of the princess, but she's condemned to be sacrificed anyway. Maciste not only survives, but escapes and saves Bangor and Saliura. Trapped in the caverns, the now-freed slaves break out onto the surface, thanks to Maciste's strength. Halis Mosab, who has become aware that she was captured as a child and somehow became queen of the 'mole men', is overjoyed when she comes to the surface and finds that she can live in the sunlight. But she accidentally falls off a cliff and into the waters of the Sacred Waterfall. The fate of her people is not revealed.

Cast 
Mark Forest as Maciste
Moira Orfei as Queen Halis Mosab
Paul Wynter as Bangor
Raffaella Carrà as Princess Saliurà
Enrico Glori as Kahab
Gianni Garko as Katan
Roberto Miali as Loth
Nando Tamberlani as King of Aran
Carla Foscari
Rosalia Gavo
Graziella Granata
Janine Hendy as Black slave girl
Cinzia Cam
Bruna Mori
Anna De Martino
Franca Polesello
Gloria Hendy as Tulac
Luciana Vivaldi

Release
Mole Men Against the Son of Hercules was released on 10 October 1961.

References

Bibliography

External links 

1961 films
1960s action adventure films
1960s fantasy adventure films
Italian action adventure films
Peplum films
1960s Italian-language films
Italian fantasy adventure films
Maciste films
Sword and sandal films
1960s fantasy action films
Films scored by Armando Trovajoli
1960s Italian films